Jerg Ratgeb, also Jörg Ratgeb ( 1480–1526), was a German painter during the Renaissance, and a contemporary of Albrecht Dürer.

Life and works
Ratgeb was born in Schwäbisch Gmünd.  Around the turn of the 15th to 16th century, he appears to have spent time in Italy, where he came in contact with Italian Renaissance art and with the recently developed use of perspective in painting. After returning to Germany, he settled in Heilbronn. In 1510, he painted the altar of Saint Barbara in the church of nearby Schwaigern.

From 1514 to 1517 he was in Frankfurt am Main, where he painted the walls of the refectory and cloister of the Karmeliterkloster (Carmelite Monastery). The paintings, of which only fragments survive, are the largest wall paintings known to the north of the Alps from that period. His most famous work is the Herrenberg Altarpiece, completed in 1521. It was originally painted for the Stiftskirche (abbey church) of Herrenberg. Today, it is on display in the Staatgalerie at Stuttgart. Ratgeb had developed a distinctive personal expressive style, visibly influenced by artists such as Albrecht Dürer, Matthias Grünewald and Hieronymus Bosch.

Because of his marriage to a serf of the Duke of Württemberg he lost most of his rights as a citizen of Heilbronn. He moved to Stuttgart, where he became a member of the city council. In that position, he negotiated with the rebelling farmers during the German Peasants' War in 1525. He became part of the military contingent requested by the rebels and was elected councillor and chancellor by the peasants. After the suppression of the rebellion, he was arrested, accused of high treason ("because of the Peasant War and on behalf of Duke Ulrich") and finally executed in Pforzheim in 1526, by being torn apart by four horses.

Reception 
Since then, it has been subject to controversial interpretations. His death has repeatedly tempted art historians, especially Wilhelm Fraenger, to read his surviving work as a political manifesto. Currently, such views are mostly rejected by scholarship.

In the 20th century, several historical novels were written about his life:
Jörg Ratgeb by Georg Schwarz. Munich, 1937;
Die Spur des namenlosen Malers (The trace of the nameless painter) by Marianne Bruns. Berlin, 1975;
Die Spur der Bilder: ein biographischer Roman um den Maler Jörg Ratgeb by Anton Monzer, Bietigheim, 1999.

Jörg Ratgeb – Painter is a 1978 East German drama film directed by Bernhard Stephan. It was entered into the 28th Berlin International Film Festival.

Since 1990, Ratgeb's life has been the subject of a play called Jerg Ratgeb, Maler – Ein Künstlerdrama, performed at the open-air theatre of the Theater Lindenhof on the Ammerhof near Tübingen. The play has also been broadcast on TV.

In 2004, the artist  painted a large four-part altarpiece depicting Ratgeb's life and death. Originally on display at St John's Church, Schwäbisch Gmünd, it has since been acquired by the Würth collection.

Bibliography 
Otto Donner von Richter: Jerg Ratgeb, Maler von Schwäbisch Gemünd,seine Wandmalereien im Karmeliterkloster zu Frankfurt und seine Altarwand in der Stiftskirche zu Herrenberg. Frankfurt/Main 1892
Wilhelm Fraenger: Jörg Ratgeb, ein Maler und Märtyrer aus dem Bauernkrieg. Dresden 1972
Ute-Nortrud Kaiser: Jörg Ratgeb – Spurensicherung, Ausstellungskatalog. Frankfurt/Main & Pforzheim 1982
Lisa Farber: Jerg Ratgeb and the Herrenberg Altarpiece, Diss. Princeton 1989
Sabine Oth: Das Wort in den Bildern von Jerg Ratgeb, Diss. Frankfurt/Main 2005
Sigrun Müller / Christian Weiss: Der Maler Jerg Ratgeb und der Bauernkrieg, Heidelberg 2023

External links 

 web.archive.org archive of remains of a defunct web-based project on Ratgeb
 Internet images at Artcyclopedia
 The Kloss altar

1480 births
1526 deaths
People from Schwäbisch Gmünd
15th-century German painters
German male painters
16th-century German painters
German Renaissance painters
Executed people from Baden-Württemberg
People executed for treason
People executed by dismemberment
16th-century executions in the Holy Roman Empire